Charles Martinet (born September 17, 1955) is an American actor and voice actor, best known for his portrayal of both Mario and Luigi in the Super Mario video game series since 1991. He is also the voice of other characters in the series such as Wario, Waluigi, and their baby equivalents.

Early life
Martinet is of French descent and speaks fluent French and Spanish. His family moved to Barcelona when he was 12 years old, and later to Paris. He attended the American School of Paris and graduated in 1974.

Martinet attended the University of California, Berkeley, where he originally intended to study international law. In his senior year he decided to discontinue his studies after a tutor told him to "regurgitate information he'd written in his book, chapter-by-chapter". A friend suggested to him to take acting classes to combat his fear of public speaking. His first role was a monologue from the Spoon River Anthology. Eventually, Martinet earned an apprenticeship at the Berkeley Repertory Theatre. After training with the Berkeley Rep for several years, Martinet went to London to attend the Drama Studio London, where among other skills, he discovered his talent for accents and dialects. Upon returning to California he joined the Berkeley Repertory Theatre. He went on to become a founding member of the San Jose Repertory Theatre for four years.

Career
Working for Nintendo since 1991, Martinet started voicing Mario at video game trade shows in which attendees would walk up to a TV screen displaying a 3-D Mario head that moved around the screen and talked. This system was called Mario in Real-Time or MIRT and was developed by Pasadena based SimGraphics. Martinet could see the attendees by means of a hidden camera setup, and a facial motion capture rig recorded his mouth movements in order to synchronize Martinet's mouth movement with the on-screen Mario mouth movement. This digital puppetry, with Martinet's comic performance, was a novelty at the time.

Martinet earned the job when, one day, he was told by his friend that there was going to be an audition at a trade show in which auditioneers "talk to people as a plumber". He went to the audition at the last minute as the casting directors were already putting away their equipment. Charles Martinet walked in and asked, "Can I please read for this?". The directors let him audition and told him, "You're an Italian plumber from Brooklyn". At first Martinet planned to talk like a stereotypical Italian American with a deep, raspy voice (which is how Mario sounded in the Super Mario Bros. Super Show, The Adventures of Super Mario Bros. 3 and Super Mario World cartoons). He then thought to himself that it would be too harsh for children to hear, so he made it more soft-hearted and friendly, resulting in what Mario's voice is today. Martinet has also stated that he kept on talking with his Mario voice until the audition tape ran out. He says that Petruchio from William Shakespeare's The Taming of the Shrew was an inspiration for his portrayal of Mario.

Martinet's first appearance in a game as Mario was in the 1994 CD re-release of Mario Teaches Typing, however, most were first exposed to Mario's voice in the landmark 1996 game Super Mario 64. During the recording session, he and a few developers wondered what Mario would do when the player leaves him alone. In the end, Martinet came up with the idea that Mario would dream of pasta during his sleep, and in the final game, Mario says "night nighty. Ahhh spaghetti, ahhh ravioli, ahhh mamma mia" when in his second sleeping position. Following Super Mario 64, he would go on to additionally voice Luigi, Wario, Waluigi, Metal Mario, Shadow Mario, Mini-Mario Toys, Baby Mario, Baby Luigi and Baby Wario in most games wherein these characters speak. He also voiced the enemies Wart, Mouser, Tryclyde, and Clawgrip in Super Mario Advance. His voice work appears in the English and Japanese language versions of the games. With his work as Mario in Super Smash Bros. Ultimate, the Guinness Book of World Records recognized Martinet for having performed the same character in one hundred different titles, the most of any video game voice actor.

Martinet provided voiceover acting for the boxers and the announcer in the Super NES title Super Punch-Out!!. He voiced the character Vigoro in Sega's Dreamcast and GameCube role-playing video game, Skies of Arcadia. He did the voice of Homunculus in the Konami PlayStation 2, Xbox and Windows game Shadow of Destiny, and provided voices for Reader Rabbit and The ClueFinders games. In 2009, Martinet told That Gaming Site that he wanted to voice Link in The Legend of Zelda: Ocarina of Time, but Shigeru Miyamoto told him that Link would remain without a voice. However, Link's grunts have been voiced by various Japanese voice actors.

In addition to video game voiceovers, Martinet has worked as a voice actor in commercials, cartoons, and promotions. At the Electronic Entertainment Expo (E3) trade show in 2005, Martinet remotely interacted with players from his New York apartment in a playable demo of Animal Crossing: Wild World. Martinet did Mario's voice as the announcer for Pac-Man Vs. on the Nintendo GameCube.

Other than the Mario series, Martinet has also done work for the video game Cel Damage as the voice of Fowl Mouth, as well as the primary voice work in several educational game series such as LeapFrog. He also voiced the dragon Paarthurnax in the 2011 video game The Elder Scrolls V: Skyrim, Orvus in 2009's Ratchet & Clank Future: A Crack in Time, and narrated the cutscenes and menus for the 2013 video game Runner2 and Runner3, appearing as a hidden playable character in the latter. Martinet also narrated for the 2020 Netflix docuseries High Score. Martinet provided the voice of Magenta in the English dub of the 2022 anime film Dragon Ball Super: Super Hero.

Public appearances
As the voice of Mario, Martinet has become a well-known personality and has made public appearances at several video game related events where he meets fans for chat, photographs, and autographs. He has made regular appearances at game events such as Electronic Entertainment Expo, Gamescom, and the Eurogamer Expo, and at launch events of games like Super Mario Galaxy and its sequel.

Filmography

Film

Television

Video games

References

External links
 
 
 Short clip of Martinet's Mario voice acting
 Podcast Interview for Scene World Magazine

1955 births
20th-century American male actors
21st-century American male actors
American expatriates in France
American expatriates in Spain
American male film actors
American male television actors
American male video game actors
American male voice actors
American people of French descent
California Democrats
Living people
Nintendo people
University of California, Berkeley alumni